Semic Press is a Swedish comic book publishing company that operated from 1963 to 1997. Known for original comics as well as translated American and European titles, Semic was for a long time the country's largest comic book publisher. For many years, Semic published the official translations of American (mostly) superhero comics produced by DC Comics and Marvel Comics. The Semic Group had divisions in a number of European countries — mostly to distribute translated American comics — including Spain, Finland, the Netherlands, Norway, France, Poland, the Czech Republic, and Hungary.

Original titles published by Semic included Bobo, Bamse, FF med Bert, and Swedish treatments of James Bond and The Phantom.

In 1997 Semic was sold to the Danish media house Egmont.

History 
Semic Press was the comics division of the Swedish publisher Åhlén & Åkerlunds, which was founded in 1906 by Johan Petter Åhlén (1879–1939) and Erik Åkerlund (1877–1940).  published such long-running titles as Vecko-Journalen ('Weekly Record'),  ('Everything for everyone'),  ('Everything for everyone this week'), Året Runt ('Year-round'),  ('Living life'),  ('Our home'), and Veckorevyn. Although many of these periodicals published comics, they usually made up less than 50% of the total pages.

Semic Press was preceded by three prior comics imprints — Alga (1942–1950),  (1950–1955), and  Youth Magazines (1955–1962).

Under its own name,  started publishing Lee Falk's The Phantom (as ) beginning in 1944.

Beginning in 1955,  was succeeded by  Youth Magazines, which lasted until 1962. 91:an launched in 1956, while  and Blondie remained popular. , based on a character from a Swedish radio series which was broadcast in the mid-1950s, joined the lineup in 1960.

Semic Press — its name being a contraction of Series and Comics — was founded in 1963, taking over publication of most of ' comics titles.

Semic acquired rival comics publisher Centerförlaget in 1970, right around when  itself ceased publishing.

In 1973, Semic was acquired by the Bonnier Group.

In 1974, Semic partnered with the Swedish publisher Allers to continue publishing the Western comics series  ('The Silver Arrow').

Semic expanded its comics market share in 1975 with the purchase of competing publisher Williams Förlag (the Swedish comics and magazines publishing division of Warner Communications). A number of Williams' titles, featuring DC Comics characters Superman, Batman, Superboy, and Tomahawk — at that point owned by Warner — had been taken over from Centerförlaget in 1969, and were continued by Semic. (Meanwhile, former  employees immediately formed Atlantic Förlags AB in 1975.  was ultimately acquired by Egmont Serieforlaget in 2000.)

In July 1986, Semic absorbed the Danish publishers Interpresse (also owned by Bonnier) and Carlsen Comics to form SEMIC Forlagene A/S, with all three publishers continuing to use their prior names. (In January 1991, Interpresse and Carlsen separated into two companies again, with the former becoming Semic Interpresse.)

In 1987, Semic worked with Lars Mortimer to create the imprint Lars Mortimer; Semic Press AB; the imprint published Mortimer's humor title  In 1988, the company formed , which handled superhero reprint translations from Marvel Comics and DC Comics.

From July 2, 1997, all comics releases were taken over by Egmont Serieforlaget; the long-running titles Tom & Jerry [], and Agent X9 are still being published. Semic continues to exist as  Semic, but generally does not publish comics. The publication of graphic novels is done through the imprint Kartago Förlag, a company that Bonnier bought from the Norwegian publisher Schibsted and placed as an entity within Semic in January 2010.

Semic Group foreign divisions 
 Czech Republic: Semic-Slovart (1991) — defunct by 1994
 Finland: Semic  (1966) — operated the imprints Semic Press Oy and Kustannus Oy Semic
 Kustannus Oy Williams (1976) — originally the Finnish division of Williams Publishing
 France: Semic S.A. (1988) — formed from the acquisition of Editions Lug
 Hungary: Semic Interprint (1988) — incorporated the older publisher Interprint; later renamed Adoc-Semic
 Netherlands: Semic Press (1967) — eventually became completely independent of the parent company
 Juniorpress (1973) — originally a branch of the Dutch Semic Press
 Norway: Semic (1976) — became Bonnier Publications/Semic AS in 1995 when it was merged with another Bonnier-owned publisher, Nordisk Forlag AS
 Poland: TM-Semic (1990) — changed name to Fun Media in 2002
 Spain: Semic Española de Ediciones, S. A. (1963) — defunct by 1969

Titles published (selected)

References

Notes

Sources

External links
 
Semic Press on Phantomwiki 
Semic on Seriewikin 
Semic on ComicWiki.dk 

Defunct comics and manga publishing companies
Privately held companies of Sweden
Publishing companies established in 1963
Publishing companies of Sweden
Swedish comics
Swedish companies established in 1963